Moon magic is associated with the Moon. There is a belief common to many cultures that working rituals at the time of different phases of the moon can bring about physical or psychological change or transformation. These rituals have historically occurred on or around the full moon and to a lesser extent the new moon. Such practices are common amongst adherents of neopagan and witchcraft systems such as Wicca. Witches in Greek and Roman literature, particularly those from Thessaly, were regularly accused of "drawing down the Moon" by use of a magic spell. The trick serves to demonstrate their powers (Virgil Eclogues 8.69), to perform a love spell (Suetonius Tiberius 1.8.21) or to extract a magical juice from the Moon (Apuleius Metamorphoses 1.3.1).  These beliefs would seem to be consistent with many other cultures traditions, for instance; casting of the spell is often done during the full moon's apex.

Books
Moon Magic is the title of a number of neopagan and new age books:
 Fortune, Dion (1979) Moon Magic. Boston: Weiser Books. . A novel by esoteric author Dion Fortune which is a sequel to The Sea Priestess.
 Jaffer, Hassan (2005) Moon Magic. Willowdale: Astrograph Inc. An annually published astrological self-help guide by astrologer Hassan Jaffer, using lunar cycles.
 Reid, Lori (1998) Moon Magic: How to Use the Moon's Phases to Inspire and Influence Your Relationships, Home Life, and Business. New York, NY: Three Rivers Press. . A self-help guide using the Moon's cycles by astrologer Lori Reid.

See also
 Esbat
 Magic (supernatural)
 Magic and religion
 Modern paganism and New Age
 Wicca
 Witchcraft

References

External links

Moon myths
Magic (supernatural)
New Age
Ceremonial magic